Țambula is a commune in Sîngerei District, Moldova. It is composed of three villages: Octeabriscoe, Pălăria and Țambula.

References

Communes of Sîngerei District